The sixth season of the television comedy Portlandia began airing on IFC in the United States on January 21, 2016, consisting a total of 10 episodes. The series stars Fred Armisen and Carrie Brownstein.

Cast

Main cast
Fred Armisen
Carrie Brownstein

Special guest cast
Kyle MacLachlan as Mr. Mayor

Guest stars

Episodes

References

External links 
Ultimate Character and Episode Guide
 

2016 American television seasons
Portlandia (TV series)